Chheskam  is a village development committee in Solukhumbu District in the Sagarmatha Zone of north-eastern Nepal. At the time of the 1991 Nepal census it had a population of 2824 people living in 641 individual households.

It is located in the Hongu valley.

References

External links
UN map of the municipalities of Solukhumbu District

Populated places in Solukhumbu District